Goodnight is an unincorporated community in Armstrong County, Texas, United States. The community is part of the Amarillo Metropolitan Statistical Area. In 2000, the population was 18.

History
Goodnight was named for pioneer rancher Charles Goodnight, who settled on a ranch near the community after selling it to the JA Ranch in 1887. The ranch was the first building in the community and remained in the community in 1890, along with a buffalo herd he had on the ranch to help preserve the species. He was the dominant force in the community until he died in December 1929. The Fort Worth and Denver Railway built a station at that same spot, with John Dorterer as the station agent and CM McCurdy as a section foreman. A post office was established at Goodnight in November 1888 and remained in operation until 1969, with Sam Dyer as postmaster. R.A. Hathorn, who served as the blacksmith at the JA Ranch, opened his shop that same year. A newspaper called the Goodnight News was first published in 1890 and merged with the Claude Argus to become the Claude News. Goodnight Baptist Church was chartered in 1904. The community had nine businesses and 300 residents in 1940. The community's business district declined with the emergence of Claude as the county's business center and improved transportation and communication facilities. Its population plunged from 200 in 1944 to 25 in 1969. It continued to decline even when the 1963 film Hud was filmed in the area. The Goodnight Ranch facilities, a church, and a cemetery remained there in 1984, along with a population of only 18 in 2000.   

A folk-rock band called Goodnight, Texas was named after the town of Goodnight, located  directly between their hometowns of Chapel Hill, North Carolina, and San Francisco, California. The band has performed in town 3 times as of 2017.

The Charles and Mary Ann (Molly) Goodnight Ranch House is currently listed on the National Register of Historic Places.

Geography

Education
Goodnight's first school was established in 1891, with Goodnight College operating from 1898 through 1917. The school was run in cooperation with the local Baptist church. Today, the community is served by the Clarendon Independent School District.

References

Unincorporated communities in Amarillo metropolitan area
Unincorporated communities in Armstrong County, Texas
Unincorporated communities in Texas